Sydney Bathgate (20 December 1919 – 15 February 1963) was a Scottish footballer who played as a full-back.

Club career
Bathgate played as a full-back for Chelsea, amassing 135 league appearances.

References

1919 births
1963 deaths
Footballers from Aberdeen
Scottish footballers
Association football defenders
Chelsea F.C. players
Hamilton Academical F.C. players
Keith F.C. players